Antonín Maleček (1909 – 14 September 1964) was a Czechoslovak international table tennis player.

He won three medals at the World Table Tennis Championships in the team events. This culminated in a gold medal at the 1932 World Table Tennis Championships for Czechoslovakia.

He also won two English Open titles.

He kept a scrapbook on the history of Czech table tennis and died in 1964.

See also
 List of table tennis players
 List of World Table Tennis Championships medalists

References

Czechoslovak male table tennis players
1909 births
1964 deaths
World Table Tennis Championships medalists